Hondor (also Romanized as Handar and Hundār) is a village in Pachehlak-e Gharbi Rural District, in the Central District of Azna County, Lorestan Province, Iran. At the 2006 census, its population was 39, in 6 families.

References 

Towns and villages in Azna County